Parmouti 28 - Coptic Calendar - Parmouti 30

The twenty-ninth day of the Coptic month of Parmouti, the eighth month of the Coptic year. In common years, this day corresponds to April 24, of the Julian Calendar, and May 7, of the Gregorian Calendar. This day falls in the Coptic Season of Shemu, the season of the Harvest.

Commemorations

Feasts 

 Monthly commemoration of the Feasts of the Annunciation, Nativity, and Resurrection

Apostles 

 The departure of Saint Erastus, one of the Seventy Apostles

Saints 

 The departure of Saint Acacius, Bishop of Jerusalem

References 

Days of the Coptic calendar